Paul R. Soglin (born April 22, 1945) is an American politician and former three-time Mayor of Madison, Wisconsin, having served a total of 22 years in that office between 1973 and 2019. A member of the Democratic Party, he was a candidate for Governor of Wisconsin in the 2018 Democratic primary.

Early life and education 

Soglin was raised in the Hyde Park neighborhood of Chicago, Illinois. He attended Hyde Park High School (now Hyde Park Career Academy), and graduated from Highland Park High School in 1962. He enrolled at the University of Wisconsin-Madison (UW) in the fall of 1962 as a pre-medical student, obtaining a Bachelor of Arts with honors in history in 1966. After spending three years in the UW History graduate program, he went on to earn a Doctor of Jurisprudence (JD) degree from the University of Wisconsin Law School in 1972. Both of Soglin's parents were Jewish and he and his siblings were raised as secular Jews. He attended the South Side School of Jewish Studies.

Activism 

In 1962 he was elected treasurer of the UW-Madison chapter of the Student Nonviolent Coordinating Committee (SNCC). In October 1963, Soglin joined 200 classmates at a rally on the steps of the Memorial Union protesting the presence of U.S. military advisers who were suspected of active participation in the Vietnam War.

In 1964 a group of suburban women partnered with William Moyer, Grace Mary and Hub Stern and other Chicago area activists focusing their Housing Opportunities Program through the Chicago Regional Office of the American Friends Service Committee (AFSC). The effort which was to create open housing in the Chicago suburbs was known as the North Shore Summer Project (NSSP). In the late spring of 1965 Soglin and a dozen other college students set out in suburbs such as Winnetka, Wilmette, and Kenilworth going door-to door with petitions calling for real estate agents to show and sell homes to "Negroes". Before the summer was out volunteers had contacted over 600 home sellers and over 1,500 other residents.

Soglin participated in demonstrations against the Dow Chemical Company on the University of Wisconsin–Madison campus in 1967. Dow had come to the University of Wisconsin–Madison campus to recruit engineering students as potential new employees, but students protested the company's presence because of Dow's role in the manufacture of napalm and Agent Orange used in Vietnam. Beaten by police during the demonstrations, Soglin was elected to lead the subsequent student strike.

Much of this demonstration was captured on film, and an interview of Soglin by journalist and author David Maraniss served as the basis for several chapters of the book They Marched Into Sunlight, and for the PBS documentary Two Days in October. Interview footage with Soglin also figures prominently in the documentary, The War at Home (1979), which chronicled the history of Madison in the Vietnam War era.

Political career 
While a graduate student in the University of Wisconsin–Madison History Department, Soglin was elected to Madison's Common Council in 1968. He was re-elected in 1970 and 1972. In November 1972, Soglin announced that he was a candidate for mayor of Madison.  He advanced in the March 1973 primary election, and upset incumbent Mayor William Dyke in the April 3, 1973, spring general election.

In May 1969, Soglin, while representing the Eighth Ward, was arrested twice at the first Mifflin Street Block Party. He was tried and found guilty of failing to obey the lawful order of a police officer. The charge of unlawful assembly was dismissed in Dane County Courts.  The arrest was later described as a "badge of honor," as Soglin was intentionally defying the city's attempt to ban the left-wing gathering.

Soglin served as mayor of Madison for three terms, from 1973 to 1979. In 1975, Mayor Soglin gave the key to the city to Cuban Prime Minister Fidel Castro. From 1979 to 1980 he was a fellow at Harvard Kennedy School at Harvard University. After working for nearly a decade as a lawyer in Madison, Soglin returned to office in 1989, serving three additional terms as mayor until 1997. In October 1996 he announced he would resign as mayor effective April 1997, regardless of the outcome of his congressional campaign. At the time Soglin was campaigning for the United States House of Representatives, seeking to represent Wisconsin's 2nd congressional district in the election scheduled for November 5, 1996. His bid was unsuccessful. In 2003, he sought election again as mayor of Madison and was defeated by a narrow margin by Dave Cieslewicz.

Soglin returned to city politics in 2011 as a candidate in the 2011 mayoral election, where he defeated the incumbent Cieslewicz in a close race. He took the oath of office for his third stint as mayor on April 19, 2011.  During his first year back in office, Soglin attempted to put an end to the Mifflin Street Block Party, no longer an event with political content but marked by knifings, sexual assaults, and significant transports to detox.  As with earlier attempts, the attempt to shut down the block party was unsuccessful but by 2017 the sexual abuses and assaults were all but eliminated.
After returning to office in 2011, food policy in the city became a priority for Mayor Soglin.  In 2013, he was named Chairman of the Food Policy Task Force of the United States Conference of Mayors. He initially served as co-chair with Boston Mayor Thomas Menino, and later was co-chair with Washington, D.C., Mayor Muriel Bowser.  The task force was established to develop strategies to increase access to healthy, affordable food in low-income communities, increase food procurement from local sources, promote food-related economic development, and reduce obesity.  In 2018, Soglin and Bowser, at the 86th winter meeting of the U.S. Conference of Mayors in Washington, D.C., announced they would join 160 other cities in signing the Milan Urban Food Policy Pact.

On April 7, 2015 Soglin was again re-elected defeating Alderman Scott Resnick with a record 72% of the vote 37,790 to 14,235. Mayor Soglin jokingly said, using the rhetoric of his critics, "I'm the guy, if you can't tell the difference between us, who is identified as old, tired, gray and bland. Well, I'm going to show you old, tired, gray and bland."

Soglin joined the 2018 campaign for governor of Wisconsin, running in the Democratic primary against nine other candidates.  Soglin eventually finished a distant seventh in the Democratic primary, losing to state superintendent Tony Evers, who would ultimately go on to defeat incumbent Governor Scott Walker in the general election.

Despite initially stating during his gubernatorial campaign that he would not run for reelection as mayor of Madison, Soglin announced that he would be seeking another term in October 2018. Soglin ultimately advanced through the February primary election, but was defeated in the April general election by former alderman Satya Rhodes-Conway.  Rhodes-Conway became Madison's first openly-gay mayor, and only the second female mayor in the city's history.  Soglin was defeated soundly in the election by a wide 62% to 38% margin.  Rhodes-Conway won in over 80% of the city's wards, but ran up large majorities in the University of Wisconsin precincts that had first brought Soglin to office 46 years earlier.

Accomplishments as mayor 

Among the changes and accomplishments on Soglin's watch:
 Soglin led the project to construct the State Street Mall and the Concourse around the Capitol Square.
 Under his guidance, the city started its first day care program, providing certification for independent day care centers.
 During his first administration, the city coordinated renovation of several buildings on State Street to build the Madison Civic Center. (That center was later renovated and is now the Overture Center.)
 Soglin led reforms in the city's hiring of women and minorities.
 Soglin led the city of Madison's effort in the 1990s of Monona Terrace, to construct a building conceived by architect Frank Lloyd Wright in the 1930s.
 In 1975, Soglin became the first U.S. mayor and only the fourth politician from the United States to meet Fidel Castro.

Madison's bond rating (per Moody's Investment Services) was upgraded from AA to AAA status in Soglin's first term in office after he made a personal visit to the New York offices of the rating company. Madison was also named to the most livable cities list several times during Soglin's second tenure as mayor, capturing the number one spot in 1996 
and again in 1998.

In 2018 the Brookings Institution found that of the one hundred largest U.S. cities, "...only 11 metro areas achieved inclusive economic growth and prosperity by posting improvements across every measure: Cincinnati, Des Moines, Detroit, Greenville, Madison, Minneapolis–St. Paul, Portland, Providence, San Francisco, Spokane, and Washington, D.C."

Electoral history

Madison Mayor (1973, 1975, 1977)

| colspan="6" style="text-align:center;background-color: #e9e9e9;"| Primary Election, March 6, 1973

| colspan="6" style="text-align:center;background-color: #e9e9e9;"| General Election, April 3, 1973

Madison Mayor (1989, 1991, 1993)

United States House of Representatives (1996)

| colspan="6" style="text-align:center;background-color: #e9e9e9;"| Primary Election, September 10, 1996

| colspan="6" style="text-align:center;background-color: #e9e9e9;"| General Election, November 5, 1996

Madison Mayor (2003, 2011, 2015)

Wisconsin Governor (2018)

| colspan="6" style="text-align:center;background-color: #e9e9e9;"| Democratic Primary Election, August 14, 2018

Madison Mayor (2019)

| colspan="6" style="text-align:center;background-color: #e9e9e9;"| Primary Election, February 19, 2019

| colspan="6" style="text-align:center;background-color: #e9e9e9;"| General Election, April 2, 2019

References

Sources 
 Kenner, Robert, director (2005). Two Days in October. Documentary film. PBS Direct. DVD Release, November 8, 2005. 
 Maraniss, David (2003). They Marched Into Sunlight: War and Peace Vietnam and America, October 1967. Simon & Schuster. 
 Silber, Glenn and Barry Alexander Brown, directors (1979). The War at Home. Documentary film. Buena Vista Home Entertainment. DVD Release, September 3, 2002.

External links 
 Soglin for Mayor (Archived)
 
 
 Waxing America, Paul Soglin's blog
 Paul Soglin bio at University of Wisconsin-Madison La Follette School of Public Affairs
 

|-

|-

1945 births
21st-century American politicians
Jewish mayors of places in the United States
Harvard Kennedy School staff
Living people
Mayors of Madison, Wisconsin
Politicians from Chicago
University of Wisconsin Law School alumni
Wisconsin city council members
Wisconsin Democrats
Jewish American people in Wisconsin politics
21st-century American Jews